FIFA officially published the list of match officials (referees, assistant referees, and video assistant referees) who will officiate at the 2023 FIFA Women's World Cup.

Referees and assistant referees

Video assistant referees
On 9 January 2023, FIFA announced 19 video assistant referees (VARs) had been appointed. For the first time in the Women's World Cup, the FIFA Referees Committee had appointed six female video assistant referees.

References

External links
List of match officials

Officials